"The Heart Is Not So Smart" was a moderate hit song recorded by DeBarge for the Gordy label credited to "El DeBarge with DeBarge" on the single release. Relying on an outside producer and songwriters, this song was recorded and released as the fourth single from Debarge's fourth album, Rhythm of the Night.

The song eventually reached number 29 on the U.S. R&B chart and number 75 on the Billboard Hot 100, and helped their album Rhythm of the Night album reach Platinum status.

Charts

Credits
Lead vocals: El DeBarge
Background Vocals: Bunny DeBarge, Mark DeBarge
Bass: Abraham Laboriel
Drums: Tyrone B. Feedback 
Guitar: Jay Graydon
Percussion: John Keane
Steel Drums: Andy Narell
Keyboards and Synthesizers: Marcus Ryles, Michael Omartian,  Steven George
Engineer: Ian Eales, Jay Graydon
Written by - Diane Warren
Remix versions done by - John Morales and Sergio Munzibai

Official Versions
Album Version - 4:36 
M&M Club Mix - 6:29
Radio Edit of Club Mix - 3:52
M&M Dub Mix - 6:01 

1985 songs
1986 singles
DeBarge songs
Songs written by Diane Warren
Gordy Records singles